Events from the year 1845 in Sweden

Incumbents
 Monarch – Oscar I

Events

 Brita Sofia Hesselius opens a daguerreotype photographic studio in Karlstad and likely becomes the first professional female photographer in Sweden.
 Attarp murders
 Equal inheritance for sons and daughters (in the absence of a will).

Births
 Sigrid Björkegren, entrepreneur (died 1936) 
 12 April – Gustaf Cederström, painter  (died 1933) 
 1 July - Ika Peyron 
 26 November - Johan August Ekman

Deaths

 4 June - Lasse-Maja

References

 
Years of the 19th century in Sweden
Sweden